HKDF is a simple key derivation function (KDF) based on the HMAC message authentication code. It was initially proposed by its authors as a building block in various protocols and applications, as well as to discourage the proliferation of multiple KDF mechanisms. The main approach HKDF follows is the "extract-then-expand" paradigm, where the KDF logically consists of two modules: the first stage takes the input keying material and "extracts" from it a fixed-length pseudorandom key, and then the second stage "expands" this key into several additional pseudorandom keys (the output of the KDF).

It can be used, for example, to convert shared secrets exchanged via Diffie–Hellman into key material suitable for use in encryption, integrity checking or authentication.

It is formally described in RFC 5869. One of its authors also described the algorithm in a companion paper in 2010.

NIST SP800-56Cr2 specifies a parameterizable extract-then-expand scheme, noting that RFC5869 HKDF is a version of it and citing its paper for the rationale for the recommendations' extract-and-expand mechanisms.

There are implementations of HKDF for C#, Go, Java, JavaScript, Perl, PHP, Python, Ruby, and other programming languages.

Mechanism
HKDF is the composition of two functions, HKDF-Extract and HKDF-Expand: HKDF(salt, IKM, info, length) = HKDF-Expand(HKDF-Extract(salt, IKM), info, length)

HKDF-Extract

HKDF-Extract takes "input key material" (IKM) such as a shared secret generated using Diffie-Hellman, and an optional salt, and generates a cryptographic key called the PRK ("pseudorandom key"). This acts as a "randomness extractor", taking a potentially non-uniform value of high min-entropy and generating a value indistinguishable from a uniform random value.

HKDF-Extract is the output of HMAC with the "salt" as the key and the "IKM" as the message.

HKDF-Expand

HKDF-Expand takes the PRK, some "info", and a length, and generates output of the desired length. HKDF-Expand acts as a pseudorandom function keyed on PRK. This means that multiple outputs can be generated from a single IKM value by using different values for the "info" field.

HKDF-Expand works by repeatedly calling HMAC using the PRK as the key and the "info" field as the message. The HMAC inputs are chained by prepending the previous hash block to the "info" field and appending with an incrementing 8-bit counter.

Example: Python implementation 
#!/usr/bin/env python3
import hashlib
import hmac

hash_len = 32

def hmac_sha256(key: bytes, data: bytes):
    return hmac.new(key, data, hashlib.sha256).digest()

def hkdf_extract(salt: bytes, ikm: bytes) -> bytes:
    if len(salt) == 0:
        salt = bytes([0] * hash_len)
    return hmac_sha256(salt, ikm)

def hkdf_expand(prk: bytes, info: bytes, length: int) -> bytes:
    t = b""
    okm = b""
    i = 0
    while len(okm) < length:
        i += 1
        t = hmac_sha256(prk, t + info + bytes([i]))
        okm += t
    return okm[:length]

def hkdf(salt: bytes, ikm: bytes, info: bytes, length: int) -> bytes:
    """Key derivation function"""
    prk = hkdf_extract(salt, ikm)
    return hkdf_expand(prk, info, length)

okm = hkdf(salt=bytes.fromhex('000102030405060708090a0b0c'),
           ikm=bytes.fromhex('0b0b0b0b0b0b0b0b0b0b0b0b0b0b0b0b0b0b0b0b0b0b'),
           info=bytes.fromhex('f0f1f2f3f4f5f6f7f8f9'),
           length=42)
assert okm == bytes.fromhex(
    '3cb25f25faacd57a90434f64d0362f2a2d2d0a90cf1a5a4c5db02d56ecc4c5bf34007208d5b887185865')

References 

Cryptography
Key derivation functions